Kostja Kalonda Didier Mushidi (born June 18, 1998) is a German professional basketball player for Mitteldeutscher BC of the Basketball Bundesliga (BBL).

Born in Belgium to a Belgian mother and a Russian father, Mushidi moved to Germany with his family at the age of 2.

Career 
A product of ART Düsseldorf, Mushidi later transferred to the Dragons Rhöndorf, where he played in the youth system and strengthened Team Rhöndorf/Bonn's JBBL (under-16 Bundesliga) side starting with the 2012-13 season. After moving to the organization's under 19 side, Mushidi averaged 20.2 points, 7.2 rebounds, 2.2 assists and 1.6 steals per game in the 2014-15 season. He had made his first appearances on Rhoendorf's men's team in Germany's third division during the 2013-14 campaign.

In August 2015, Mushidi inked a two-year deal with French powerhouse Strasbourg IG. He played a total of six minutes for SIG's men's team in the 2015–16 LNB Pro A season, while mostly representing the club's development squad. He left the club after one year and signed with Serbian club Mega Leks in June 2016.

At the 2017 Nike Hoop Summit, he led the World Select Team with 14 points to go along with three assists, three steals and two rebounds. In February 2019, he left Mega Bemax to join OKK Beograd, where he left for the remainder of the 2018-19 season.

In June 2019, he signed with Basketball Löwen Braunschweig of the German Basketball Bundesliga. On December 13, 2019, he was dismissed for disciplinary reasons, the team announced without disclosing any further details. In eight Bundesliga appearances for the Braunschweig team, Mushidi averaged 11.6 points, 3.9 rebounds and 1.6 assists per contest. Mushidi was given a second chance by the Braunschweig outfit, joining the club back in August 2020.

On December 1, 2021, he has signed with Mitteldeutscher BC of the Basketball Bundesliga.

International career 
On the international stage, Mushidi represented Germany at the 2014 FIBA Europe Under-16 Championship, scoring a team-high 17.7 points per game during the tournament, while garnering Eurobasket.com All-European Championships U16 Second Team recognition. The following year, he helped Germany to an eighth-place finish at the Europe U18 Championship, leading the team in scoring along with Isaiah Hartenstein as both averaged 11.6 points a contest.

Mushidi led the German U18 national team to its first ever Albert-Schweitzer-Tournament title in March/April 2016, posting 25 points and 11 rebounds in the championship game against Serbia, and was named tournament MVP. In July 2016, he attended the U20 European championships, averaging 8.4 points, 2.6 rebounds and 1.1 assists a game throughout the tournament, while finishing in fourth place with the German team. He tallied team-bests 14.7 points and 3.8 assists along with 3.8 rebounds and 1.3 steals a contest on the way to a fourth-place finish at the 2016 U18 European Championships in Turkey.

He was Germany's co-leading scorer at the 2018 FIBA Europe Under-20 Championship, where he averaged 13.6 points a game, helping his team win the bronze medal, while being named to the All-Star Five. In November 2018, he was named to the roster of the German men's national team for the first time.

References

External links
 FIBA.com profile

1998 births
Living people
Belgian emigrants to Germany
Naturalized citizens of Germany
ABA League players
Basketball League of Serbia players
German expatriate basketball people in Serbia
German men's basketball players
German people of Belgian descent
German people of Russian descent
Belgian people of Russian descent
KK Mega Basket players
Mitteldeutscher BC players
OKK Beograd players
SIG Basket players
Shooting guards